Pablo Ferré Elías (born in Spain) was a Spanish football player, manager and referee.

He played for C.D. 33 .

He was the second person and first Spaniard to coach the El Salvador national football team in their history, during the 1935 Central American and Caribbean Games. He coached the team from 1935 to 1938.

In 1940, he was appointed to be the manager of the Club Deportivo Universidad Católica in Chile.

References

External links
 El Balon Cuscatleco: Historia

Spanish football managers
El Salvador national football team managers
Date of birth missing
Year of birth missing
Year of death missing